The ton was the high society in the United Kingdom during the late Regency era and the reign of King George IV, and later. The word means, in this context, "manners" or "style" and is pronounced as in French. The full phrase is le bon ton, meaning etiquette, "good manners" or "good form" – characteristics held as ideal by the British beau monde.

The term le beau monde (pronounced ), literally meaning "the beautiful world" (but here meaning "fashionable people," or "fashionable society"), was similar to le bon ton during the late 19th century.

The ton has also been used to refer to the Upper Ten Thousand of later 19th-century New York society as well as most of the peerage, landed gentry, and wealthy merchants or bankers of the City of London.

Social ladder 
Ton society was intensely class-conscious and the social hierarchy was rigid.

Members of the ton came from the aristocracy, gentry, royalty and monarchs. Though some wealthier members of the middle classes could marry into the lower ranks of the gentry, such unions were not completely accepted by the elite ton. Social positions could be altered or determined by income, houses, speech, manner of dress, or even etiquette. Climbing the social ladder could take generations, particularly into the aristocracy, which did not readily accept those perceived to be of inferior birth.

Circles considered "best" 
Fashion, etiquette, manners, social customs, and many other aspects of social life were all dictated by the ton. The ton's generally acknowledged leaders were the Lady Patronesses of Almack's. As London's most exclusive mixed-sex social club, Almack's represented the best and wealthiest among the ton. The conventions of ton life were highly structured and complex. Social acceptance was crucial and mostly based on birth and family. Acceptable social behaviours differed for men and women; they were based on a system validated primarily by the patronesses of Almack's, who determined who could be admitted to its functions. Some of these behaviours were flexible – they adapted slightly with the fashions of each season – but they always reflected the current modes of manners, fashion, and propriety.

The privileged members of the ton could pursue an extravagant life of indulgence, but there were often double standards for its members. The flexibility of social rules was unofficially determined by an individual's status, wealth, or family connections. Royalty were forgiven almost any transgression. Scandalous activity such as having illegitimate children or conducting extramarital affairs might incite gossip, but were often overlooked for members of the aristocracy, while such conduct among the gentry could destroy an entire family's social aspirations.

The season 
The Season was the name given to the months between late January and early July.  It officially began when Parliament reopened in London and was the season for social entertainments – balls, theatre parties, dances, masquerades, military reviews, and other social pleasures enjoyed by the ton. Families with marriageable children used the Season to present their children to the ton in hopes of arranging profitable marriages. For this reason, the Season has also been called the "Marriage Mart" by notables such as Lord Byron. For marriageable girls, the Season was an intense period of social networking in which a faux pas could affect their marriage and social prospects within the ton.

See also 
 Old money
 Brooks's
 Beau Brummell
 Regency dance
 Regency fashions
 Regency novels
 White's
 Jet set
 Cafe society
 Posh

References

External links 
 The London Season
  Almack's Assembly Rooms

Regency era
Regency London
High society (social class)